Bruce William Deacon (born December 5, 1966) is a former Canadian long-distance runner, notably in the full marathon. Deacon was born in Ottawa, Ontario, Canada.

Deacon competed in the marathon at the 1996 Summer Olympics and the 2000 Summer Olympics. He placed 11th and 16th respectively at the World Athletics Championships in 1995 and 1997. Deacon was the first two-time winner and is currently the only three-time winner of the California International Marathon (in 1991, 1995, and 2001), as well as 8th, 6th, and 4th-place finishes in 1990, 1998, and 2002 respectively. At the 2002 event, he set a personal best with a time of 2:13:18. Deacon claimed the silver medal in the marathon at the 2003 Pan American Games. Now retired from competing internationally, Bruce is a coach and sport consultant, working for Run Fast Consulting Inc.

Achievements
All results regarding marathon, unless stated otherwise.

References

External links
 IAAF Profile for Bruce Deacon
 
 
 
 

1966 births
Living people
Athletes from Ottawa
Canadian male marathon runners
Olympic track and field athletes of Canada
Athletes (track and field) at the 1994 Commonwealth Games
Athletes (track and field) at the 1996 Summer Olympics
Athletes (track and field) at the 2000 Summer Olympics
Athletes (track and field) at the 2003 Pan American Games
Commonwealth Games competitors for Canada
Pan American Games track and field athletes for Canada
Pan American Games silver medalists for Canada
Pan American Games medalists in athletics (track and field)
Medalists at the 2003 Pan American Games